Baghpat Lok Sabha constituency is one of the 80 Lok Sabha (lower house of parliament) constituencies in Uttar Pradesh state in India.

Assembly segments
Presently, after reorganisation, this Lok Sabha constituency comprises the following five Vidhan Sabha segments.

Members of Parliament

^ by-poll

Election results

General elections 2019

General elections 2014

General elections 2009

General elections 2004

Notes

External links
Baghpat lok sabha  constituency election 2019 result details
Baghpat Lok Sabha

Lok Sabha constituencies in Uttar Pradesh
Bagpat district